Robert Kling (born 1 May 1997) is a Norwegian footballer who plays for SK Vard Haugesund.

References

External links
Robert Kling at Fotball.no

1997 births
Living people
People from Haugesund
Norwegian footballers
Eliteserien players
Norwegian First Division players
Norwegian Third Division players
FK Haugesund players
Florø SK players
SK Vard Haugesund players
Association football midfielders
Sportspeople from Rogaland